Stage Dolls is the third studio album by Norwegian hard rock band Stage Dolls. Like the first two albums, it was also recorded in Trondheim, Norway, using the same producer, Bjørn Nessjø, and engineer, Rune Nordahl.

The album was released in the United States in 1989 by Chrysalis Records, Inc. The single "Love Cries" went to number 46 on the Billboard Singles Charts, and "Wings of Steel" went to number 10 in Norway. The album itself peaked at number 3 on the album charts in Norway. It was certified gold disc in Norway.

Track listing 
All music written by Torstein Flakne, all lyrics written by Flakne/ B. Icon, except where noted.
"Still in Love" – 4:18
"Wings of Steel" – 3:28
"Lorraine" – 3:20
"Waitin' for You" (T. Flakne, B. Icon) – 3:51
"Love Cries" – 4:11
"Mystery" – 3:21
"Don't Stop Believin'" – 4:22
"Hanoi Waters" – 3:22
"Ammunition" – 3:26

Personnel

Band 
Torstein Flakne – guitars, vocals
Steinar Krokstad – drums
Terje Storli – bass

Additional personnel
Kjetil Bjerkestrand – keyboards and Fairlight programming
Vaneese Thomas - background vocals
Angela Clemmons - background vocals
Benny Diggs - background vocals
Fonzie Thornton - background vocals
Phil Ballou - background vocals
Darryl Tookes - background vocals
Ronni Le Tekrø - Guitar on "Mystery"

Album credits
Bjørn Nessjø – producer
Rune Nordahl – engineer

Certifications

References

1988 albums
Stage Dolls albums